An independence day is an annual event commemorating the anniversary of a nation's independence or statehood.

Independence Day may also refer to:

Films and related media 
 Independence Day (1983 film), a film starring Kathleen Quinlan
 Independence Day (franchise), a franchise of two science-fiction action films and other media
 Independence Day (1996 film), the first film in the series, directed by Roland Emmerich
 Independence Day (video game), a 1997 game based on the film
 Independence Day (book series), a book series based on the film and its setting
 Independence Day: Resurgence, a 2016 sequel to the 1996 film
 Independence Day (2000 film), a multilingual Indian film by A. R. Ramesh

Literature 
 Independence Day (Darvill-Evans novel), a 2000 Doctor Who novel by Peter Darvill-Evans
 Independence Day (Ford novel), a 1995 novel by Richard Ford
 Independence Day, a 2015 novel by Ben Coes
 Independence Day or Iseseisvuspäev, a 1998 novel by Kaur Kender

Music

Songs 
 "Independence Day" (Bruce Springsteen song) (1980)
 "Independence Day" (Martina McBride song) (1994)
 "Independence Day", a song by Brave Saint Saturn from So Far from Home
 "Independence Day", a song by Cascada from Original Me
 "Independence Day", a song by the Comsat Angels from Waiting for a Miracle
 "Independence Day", a song by David Byrne from Rei Momo
 "Independence Day", a song by Elliott Smith from XO
 "Independence Day", a song by White Heart from Power House

Albums 
 Independence Day, a 1990 EP by The Bruisers
 Independence Day, a 2010 album by King Chip
 Independence Day, a 2004 album by Luni Coleone
 Independence Day, Volume 1 and Volume 2, 2009-10 mixtapes by D. Woods
Independence Day, a 2021 album by Fredo

Television 
 "Independence Day" (The Cosby Show)
 "Independence Day" (The Dead Zone)
 "Independence Day" (Roswell)
 "Independence Day" (Step by Step)
 "Independence Day" (The Wonder Years)
 "Independence Day" (Young Justice)

See also 
 Day of Independence, a 2003 short film aired as a PBS television special
 Independent Days (disambiguation)
 Independents Day (disambiguation)